Hurricane Kay was a strong Category 2 hurricane that made landfall along the coast of the Baja California peninsula. The twelfth named storm and eighth hurricane of the 2022 Pacific hurricane season, Kay originated from an area of disturbed weather that formed near Guatemala. Overall, damage from Kay totaled $10.62 million and four fatalities. Kay's rain was able to help fire fighters who had been struggling to put out the Fairview Fire.

Meteorological history

On August 29, the National Hurricane Center located two areas of disturbed thunderstorms that had formed south of Mexico. While one of the areas intensified quickly, becoming Tropical Storm Javier, while the other slowly intensified, organizing itself slower than Javier. By September 3, the NHC had given the area a 90% chance of forming. The next day, the area organized itself, strengthening into Tropical Depression Twelve at 05:00. By 11:00 on September 4, the depression had strengthened into Tropical Storm Kay. Kay continued organizing and intensifying, resulting in Kay strengthening into a Category 1 hurricane only one day after becoming a tropical storm. On September 6, the eye of Kay passed over Socorro Island with winds of around 85 mph (140 km/h). Kay continued intensifying, becoming a Category 2 hurricane as it moved northwestward towards Baja California. As Kay neared landfall in Baja California Sur, Kay stopped intensifying and organization and convection within Kay minimalized itself, resulting in Kay weakening back into a Category 1 hurricane on September 7. The day after weakening into a Category 1 hurricane, Kay made landfall in the western central Baja California peninsula with winds of around 75 mph (120 km/h). Shortly after landfall, Kay weakened into a tropical storm, before beginning to move northward as it passed by Cedros Island. As Kay moved northward, it transitioned into a post-tropical cyclone overnight 9–10, not far southwest from San Diego, California. Kay made a sudden turn southward and began moving south, though by September 11, Kay had completely dissipated after losing its identity.

Preparations and impact

Mexico
From September 4 to 9, Hurricane Kay's expansive rainbands brought rainfall to a cumulative 16 states across Mexico. Precipitation progressed from southern states, such as Oaxaca and Guerrero, to Baja California in the northwest portion of the nation. The majority of these totals fell within 24-hour spans. The storm struck Socorro Island on September 6, bringing  of rain that day. In addition to flooding, landslides, and falling trees, the hurricane was also responsible for three deaths in Guerrero. Kay also damaged most of the Baja California peninsula with strong winds and heavy rain, which caused much flooding and mudslides, though there were no reports of injuries. Shortly before the storm hit, over 1,600 people evacuated to shelters according to Baja California Sur state officials. Road and agricultural damage in Baja California Sur exceeded 72 million pesos (US$3.6 million), though again, no injuries were reported.

United States
Moisture associated with Hurricane Kay brought widespread heavy rain, flash floods, and damaging winds to the Southwestern United States. The National Centers for Environmental Information tabulated $7.02 million in damage across four states in relation to the storm with the majority incurred by California. A mudflow in Southern California claimed the life of one person.

California

Abundant moisture associated with the remnants of Kay led to scattered showers and thunderstorms in the Southwestern United States, particularly in California. In Imperial County, California, falling boulders created traffic along an area of I-8. Localized flooding in Death Valley National Park covered several roads, including a  stretch of road in Badwater Basin. A section of Route 190 was washed out near Towne Pass. A bus became stuck in softened sand near this location, briefly stranding motorists. A Major League Baseball game between the San Diego Padres and the Los Angeles Dodgers was delayed due to the rain. The rainfall was beneficial to crews in Riverside County, California, battling the Fairview Fire, as it mitigated some of the threat posed by the high winds and dry conditions. This mitigated the risk to an estimated 18,000 homes.

On September 12, mudflows affected several communities in the San Bernardino Mountains. A series of flows impacted multiple valleys in Forest Falls, resulting in a cascade of water, mud, and debris. Initial evacuation orders were rescinded as travel became impossible. One person was killed when her home was crushed by debris. Heavy machinery and cadaver dogs were used throughout the search. A total of six homes were destroyed in Forest Falls, two in Oak Glen, 22 other homes were otherwise damaged, and one business was severely damaged. Approximately 3,000 people were affected in the region.

Power outages affected tens of thousands across the Los Angeles Metro, though these generally lasted only a few hours. Gale and surf warnings covered the southwestern counties of California, with officials in Long Beach providing sandbags to residents. Temporary berms were constructed in Alamitos Beach to protect coastal homes. Severe beach erosion occurred in Southern California, with some coasts in the Los Angeles area losing  of sand vertically.

On September 16, California Governor Gavin Newsom declared a state of emergency for Imperial, Inyo, Los Angeles, Riverside, and San Bernardino counties owing to damage caused by Kay.

Elsewhere
Described as an "unusual setup" for Utah in particular, the National Weather Service issued slight and moderate flood-risk outlooks alongside flash flood watches for the aforementioned state along with Arizona, Nevada, and New Mexico. This rain followed deadly floods in the region just a month prior during one of the wettest monsoon seasons on record. In Nevada, wind gusts associated with storms reached  near Gold Hill. Heavy rain across the Mojave Desert caused scattered flash floods. In Overton, Nevada,  of rain fell, including  in 20 minutes. This inundated roads in several parks and left vehicles stranded across Valley of Fire State Park. Flood-related damage across the state was tabulated at $167,000. Extensive flooding occurred in Mohave County, Arizona, along the border with Nevada, forcing the closure of multiple roads. In just under two hours,  of rain fell in Getz which triggered flash floods. This inundated up to ten homes and necessitated eight water rescues in the community. Another swift water rescue was performed along Oatman Highway. Damage in Arizona reached $139,500. In New Mexico, north-to-south propagating thunderstorms brought heavy rain and strong winds to the northern mountains. The Beaver and Gallinas creeks flooded along Highway 65, leaving behind debris on the roads and inundating nearby homes. Another storm similarly affected areas within the McBride Fire burn scar in Lincoln County. Damage across New Mexico reached $220,000.

See also
 Other storms of the same name
 Weather of 2022
 Tropical cyclones in 2022
 Timeline of the 2022 Pacific hurricane season
 Hurricane Olaf (2021) – Category 2 hurricane that took a similar path
 Hurricane Lorena (2019) – Category 1 hurricane that took a similar path
 Hurricane Ignacio (2003) – Category 2 hurricane that took a near-identical path

References

External links

2022 Pacific hurricane season
Tropical cyclones in 2022
Category 2 Pacific hurricanes
September 2022 events
2022 in Mexico